Thryptomene globifera is a species of flowering plant in the family Myrtaceae and is endemic to western areas of Western Australia. It is a shrub with crowded, upward-pointing, broadly egg-shaped leaves with the narrower end towards the base, and pale pink or mauve flowers with ten stamens.

Description
Flowering occurs from August to October.

Taxonomy
Thryptomene globifera was first formally described in 2014 by Barbara Lynette Rye in the journal Nuytsia from specimens collected near Indarra in 2003. The specific epithet (globifera) means "sphere-bearing", referring to the flower clusters.

Distribution and habitat
This thryptomene grows in woodland in sandy soil between the Eurardy Reserve, Ajana and Mullewa in the Avon Wheatbelt, Geraldton Sandplains and Yalgoo biogeographic regions.

Conservation status
Thryptomene globifera is classified as "not threatened" by the Western Australian Government Department of Parks and Wildlife.

References

globifera
Endemic flora of Western Australia
Rosids of Western Australia
Plants described in 2014
Taxa named by Barbara Lynette Rye